Two Fingers can refer to:

Two Fingers, a musical project consisting of Amon Tobin and Doubleclick
Two Fingers, a song by Jake Bugg
V sign